Antony Varghese, known by his screen name Pepe is an Indian actor who appears in Malayalam films. He made his debut in 2017 through the film Angamaly Diaries.

Personal life 
Antony Varghese was born in Angamaly, Kerala to Varghese and Alphonsa on 11 October 1989. He did his graduation in Maharaja's College, Ernakulam. On 7 August 2021, he married his longtime girlfriend, Aneesha Paulose.

Career
He made his debut in 2017 by portraying the lead role of Vincent Pepe in Angamaly Diaries, directed by Lijo Jose Pellissery. The film was a blockbuster which rose him to fame. He is now well known by his screen name in the movie, Pepe. This character took him to places and won several awards including Filmfare Awards South. His second film was Swathandriam Ardharathriyil, directed by debutant Tinu Pappachan. It is a Kottayam based thriller. He signed Jallikattu marking his second collaboration with Lijo Jose Pellissery. Both these movies were financially successful while the latter was nominated as one of India's Oscar entries under the feature film category. The actor's performance in the movie was critically acclaimed. His latest movie Ajagajantharam, marking his next collaboration with Tinu Pappachan, released on 23 December 2021.

His first film in 2022 was Super Sharanya in which he played a cameo role.

Filmography

Films

Short films

Awards

References

External links
 
 

Indian male film actors
Living people
Male actors in Malayalam cinema
1989 births
21st-century Indian male actors
Indian male voice actors
Male actors from Kerala
People from Angamaly
People from Ernakulam district
Indian Christians
Filmfare Awards South winners